William Henry "Smush" Parker (born June 1, 1981) is an American former professional basketball player. He played in the National Basketball Association (NBA), the NBA D-League and several leagues overseas. Parker played shooting guard in college but moved to point guard in the NBA.

Early years
Parker was born in Brooklyn to parents William "Bill" Henry Parker II and Robin Royal Parker. He attended Newtown High School in Elmhurst, Queens, where he was a star guard on their varsity basketball team. He then enrolled in the College of Southern Idaho as a freshman in the 1999–2000 season and transferred to play college basketball at Fordham University. Following his sophomore season at Fordham University, he entered the NBA in 2002 but went undrafted. During his sophomore season, he was Second Team All A-10 and Second Team NABC All-Region.

Professional career

Early career
While Parker was not drafted out of college, the Cleveland Cavaliers signed him for the 2002–03 season.

In 2003, Parker signed with Aris Thessaloniki of the Greek League (FIBA Europe) and helped the team win the 2004 Greek Basketball Cup in the final against Olympiacos. He returned to the NBA in 2004 and played for the Detroit Pistons and the Phoenix Suns.

Los Angeles Lakers (2005-2007)

He then signed a contract with the Los Angeles Lakers during the summer of 2005.

Not well-known entering the 2005 season, Parker gained recognition as the starting point guard for the Lakers under coach Phil Jackson. While many experts thought that either newly-signed veteran Aaron McKie or Sasha Vujačić would start at point guard, Parker became the surprise starter in the Lakers' season opener against the Denver Nuggets and went on to score at least 20 points in four of his first five games. This impressed Jackson, and Parker found himself in the starting line-up for the Lakers. From 2005 until 2007, Parker started 162 straight games, averaging 11.5 points. During the last two games of the regular season and the playoffs (2006–2007), Parker lost his starting spot to rookie Jordan Farmar.

While with the Lakers, Parker clashed with coaches and players, including All-star Kobe Bryant. He admitted to intentionally ignoring Bryant and not passing him the ball. Bryant singled out Parker as a bad teammate, saying in 2012 that Parker "shouldn't have been in the NBA, but [the Lakers] were too cheap to pay for a point guard." Parker would later detail how Kobe was a bad teammate, and after Bryant's tragic death in 2020 confirmed that the two men had never reconciled their differences.

Later NBA and overseas career

On July 26, 2007, Parker signed with the Miami Heat. For the Heat, Parker wore jersey number 21. His production dropped off dramatically while with the Heat, with averages of 4.8 points, 1.7 assists and 2.1 rebounds, compared to his 11.1 in 164 games with the Los Angeles Lakers. After a physical altercation that Parker had with a parking attendant in November 2007, the Miami Heat put him on paid leave to investigate the matter. On March 10, 2008, the Miami Heat officially waived Parker. The Los Angeles Clippers then signed him for the rest of the season on March 12, 2008.

On July 10, 2008, the Los Angeles Clippers officially renounced their rights to Parker. In the 2008 offseason, Parker was signed by the Denver Nuggets but was released on October 23, 2008, as the Nuggets trimmed their roster to the league-allowed 15. He then played with the Rio Grande Valley Vipers of the NBA Development League.

On January 9, 2009, Parker officially signed with Guangdong Southern Tigers of the Chinese Basketball Association.

In September 2010, he signed a one-year contract with the Russian club Spartak Saint Petersburg.

In January 2011, he returned to Greece and signed a contract with Iraklis Thessaloniki.

In January 2012, Parker signed with Petrochimi Bandar Imam of the Iranian Basketball Super League. He later played in Venezuela, then signed with the Indios de San Francisco de Macorís of the Dominican Republic. In December 2012, Parker signed with Cibona Zagreb of the Adriatic Basketball Association. After only 5 games in Adriatic League, Parker was released.

In March 2013, he returned to Greece and signed a contract with Peristeri of the Greek League.

In January 2014, he signed with his former team Guaros de Lara. He left the team that March. In June, Parker played in The Basketball Tournament. His team reached the semi-finals, and Parker's averages for the tournament were 16.2 points, 7.8 rebounds, 7.0 assists and 1.8 steals per game.

In February 2015, Parker signed with Mon-Altius Madimos Falcons of the Mongolian National Basketball Association (MNBA). He averaged 24 points, 7.0 rebounds, 6.5 assists and 4.1 steals per game.

On November 30, 2017, Parker signed with the Albany Patroons of the North American Premier Basketball.

NBA career statistics

Regular season

|-
| style="text-align:left;"| 
| style="text-align:left;"| Cleveland
| 66 || 18 || 16.7 || .402 || .322 || .831 || 1.8 || 2.5 || .7 || .2 || 6.2
|-
| style="text-align:left;"| 
| style="text-align:left;"| Detroit
| 11 || 1 || 10.0 || .393 || .222 || .692 || .8 || 1.0 || .3 || .0 || 3.0
|-
| style="text-align:left;"| 
| style="text-align:left;"| Phoenix
| 5 || 0 || 6.8 || .467 || .250 || .000 || .6 || .8 || .4 || .0 || 3.0
|-
| style="text-align:left;"| 
| style="text-align:left;"| L.A. Lakers
| 82 || 82 || 33.8 || .447 || .366 || .694 || 3.3 || 3.7 || 1.7 ||.2 || 11.5
|-
| style="text-align:left;"| 
| style="text-align:left;"| L.A. Lakers
| 82 || 80 || 30.0 || .436 || .365 || .646 || 2.5 || 2.8 || 1.5 || .1 || 11.1
|-
| style="text-align:left;"| 
| style="text-align:left;"| Miami
| 9|| 0 || 20.3 || .315 || .250 || .750 || 2.1 || 1.7 || .6 || .3 || 4.8
|-
| style="text-align:left;"| 
| style="text-align:left;"| L.A. Clippers
| 19 || 2 || 21.5 || .362 || .222 || .667 || 1.7 || 3.6 || 1.0 || .2 || 6.4
|- class="sortbottom"
| style="text-align:center;" colspan="2"| Career
| 274 || 183 || 25.8 || .426 || .345 || .708 || 2.4 || 2.9 || 1.2 || .2 || 9.0

Playoffs

|-
| style="text-align:left;"| 2006
| style="text-align:left;"| L.A. Lakers
| 7 || 7 || 36.9 || .333 || .154 || 1.000 || 3.0 || 1.6 || 2.1 || .1 || 8.9
|-
| style="text-align:left;"| 2007
| style="text-align:left;"| L.A. Lakers
| 5 || 0 || 11.8 || .154 || .167 || 1.000 || 1.4 || .6 || .6 || .2 || 1.8
|- class="sortbottom"
| style="text-align:center;" colspan="2"| Career
| 12 || 7 || 26.4 || .306 || .156 || 1.000 || 2.3 || 1.2 || 1.5 || .2 || 5.9

Personal life

Parker earned his nickname "Smush" at the age of 13. According to childhood friends, he often fouled out during pickup games by "smushing" opponents' faces as retribution for stealing the ball away from him. Parker has one daughter from a previous relationship.

References

External links
 Smush Parker bio on NBA.com
 Smush Parker D-League profile

1981 births
Living people
African-American basketball players
American expatriate basketball people in China
American expatriate basketball people in Croatia
American expatriate basketball people in Greece
American expatriate basketball people in Iran
American expatriate basketball people in Russia
American expatriate basketball people in Venezuela
American men's basketball players
Basketball players from New York City
Aris B.C. players
BC Spartak Saint Petersburg players
Cleveland Cavaliers players
Detroit Pistons players
Florida Flame players
Fordham Rams men's basketball players
Guangdong Southern Tigers players
Idaho Stampede (CBA) players
Iraklis Thessaloniki B.C. players
KK Cibona players
Los Angeles Clippers players
Los Angeles Lakers players
Miami Heat players
Newtown High School alumni
Peristeri B.C. players
Phoenix Suns players
Point guards
Rio Grande Valley Vipers players
Shooting guards
Southern Idaho Golden Eagles men's basketball players
Sportspeople from Brooklyn
Sportspeople from Queens, New York
Undrafted National Basketball Association players
21st-century African-American sportspeople
20th-century African-American people